Owen McIntosh Burns (September 6, 1892 – October 26, 1952) was a United States district judge of the United States District Court for the Western District of Pennsylvania.

Education and career

Born in Danville, Illinois, Burns received an Artium Baccalaureus degree from the University of Illinois at Urbana–Champaign in 1916. During World War I he served in the United States Army infantry, holding the rank of captain. He received a Bachelor of Laws from the University of Illinois College of Law in 1921. He was in private practice in Erie, Pennsylvania from 1921 until 1947, when he became United States Attorney for the Western District of Pennsylvania, a position he held until 1949.

Federal judicial service

Burns received a recess appointment from President Harry S. Truman on October 21, 1949, to the United States District Court for the Western District of Pennsylvania, to a new seat authorized by 63 Stat. 493. He was nominated to the same position by President Truman on January 5, 1950. He was confirmed by the United States Senate on March 8, 1950, and received his commission on March 9, 1950. His service terminated on October 26, 1952, due to his death.

References

Sources
 

1892 births
1952 deaths
People from Danville, Illinois
University of Illinois Urbana-Champaign alumni
Judges of the United States District Court for the Western District of Pennsylvania
United States district court judges appointed by Harry S. Truman
20th-century American judges
United States Army officers
United States Attorneys for the Western District of Pennsylvania
University of Illinois College of Law alumni